Höferlin is a surname. Notable people with the surname include:

 Julien Hoferlin (1966–2016), Belgian tennis coach
 Manuel Höferlin (born 1973), German politician